Jo Graham is an American author who debuted in 2008 with her novel Black Ships, a re-imagination of The Aeneid.  She lives in Maryland. Her influences as a writer are Mary Renault and James Michener, both of whom wrote novels about places and situations unusual for most readers.

Black Ships received a star rating when reviewed by Publishers Weekly and was nominated for the 2009 Locus Award for Best First Novel.  Her second novel, Hand of Isis (March 2009), which features the reincarnated main character of Black Ships, was given a starred review by Kirkus Reviews.

She has published several Stargate Atlantis tie-in novels with by Fandemonium Press.

Her forthcoming works include Sounding Dark, a space opera, to be published in December 2021 by Candlemark & Gleam.

Books
 Black Ships (Hachette Book Group, 2008)  
2009 Locus Award Finalist
 Hand of Isis (Hachette Book Group, 2009)   
 Stealing Fire (Orbit, 2010)
 Stargate Atlantis: Death Game (Fandemonium (publisher), 2010)
 Stargate Atlantis: Homecoming, with Melissa Scott (Fandemonium, 2010)
 Stargate Atlantis: The Lost, with Amy Griswold (Fandemonium, 2011)
 Stargate Atlantis: The Furies,  (Fandemonium, 2012)
 Stargate Atlantis: Secrets, with Melissa Scott (Fandemonium, 2012)
 Lost Things, with Melissa Scott (Crossroad Press, 2012)
 The General's Mistress (Gallery Press, 2012)
 Stargate SG-1: Moebius Squared, with Melissa Scott (Fandemonium, 2012)
 Stargate Atlantis: Inheritors, with Melissa Scott (Fandemonium, 2013)
 Steel Blues, with Melissa Scott (Crossroad Press, 2013)
 The Emperor's Agent, (Crossroad Press, 2013)
 Cythera, (Supposed Crimes, November 2013)
  Silver Bullet, with Melissa Scott (November 2013)
 Stargate Atlantis: Unascended, with Amy Griswold (Fandemonium, 2014)
  Wind Raker, with Melissa Scott (2014)
 Stargate Atlantis: Third Path, with Melissa Scott (Fandemonium, 2015)
  Oath Bound, with Melissa Scott (2016)
 The Marshal's Lover, (Crossroad Press, 2016)

References

External links
 Jo Graham's blog
 WETA Interview

Living people
21st-century American novelists
1968 births
American historical novelists
American women novelists
21st-century American women writers
Women historical novelists